Lynda Morgan Lovejoy (born February 1, 1949) is an American politician. She is a former Democratic member of the New Mexico Senate.

Early life and education 
Lovejoy is from Crownpoint, New Mexico.

She earned an Associate of Arts degree in elementary education from the University of New Mexico and a Bachelor of Science from Northern Arizona University.

Career
She served as commissioner in the New Mexico Public Regulation Commission (PRC), 1999 to 2006. She served as chairperson of the PRC for three years and vice-chairperson for one year.

She served in the New Mexico House of Representatives from 1988 to 1998. She served as chairperson of the House Government and Urban Affairs Committee. She served as co-chairperson of the Interim Indian Affairs Committee.

She was appointed in 2007 and elected to a full term in the New Mexico Senate in 2008, representing District 22, which encompasses parts of Bernalillo, Cibola, McKinley, Rio Arriba and Sandoval counties. served as vice-chair of the Senate Corporations and Transportation Committee.

Lovejoy has also worked as a consultant for telecommunications and utilities companies.

Navajo Nation presidential runs
During the 2010 Navajo Nation primary, Lovejoy won 17,137 votes, 35.7% of total vote; her nearest challenger followed with 7,763 votes, or 16.2 percent. Compared to the 2006 presidential primary, she nearly doubled the 10,513 votes she gained in the earlier election.

Navajo Nation Vice-President Ben Shelly defeated Lovejoy in 2010.

References

External links
 Lynda Lovejoy at the New Mexico Legislature website
 Project Vote Smart – Senator Lynda Lovejoy (NM) profile
 Follow the Money – Lynda M. Lovejoy
 20082004 2002 campaign contributions
 Navajos elect tribe's vice-president at KOB.com

1949 births
Living people
Democratic Party members of the New Mexico House of Representatives
Native American state legislators in New Mexico
Native American women in politics
Navajo Nation politicians
Democratic Party New Mexico state senators
Northern Arizona University alumni
People from Crownpoint, New Mexico
Women state legislators in New Mexico
20th-century Native Americans
21st-century Native Americans
20th-century Native American women
21st-century Native American women